Mordellistena bipartita is a beetle in the genus Mordellistena of the family Mordellidae. It was described in 1942 by Píc.

References

bipartita
Beetles described in 1942